Shcherbakovo is a rural locality (a selo) in Alexeyevsky District, Belgorod Oblast, Russia. The population was 413 as of 2010. There are 5 streets.

Geography 
Shcherbakovo is located 14 km south of Alexeyevka (the district's administrative centre) by road. Kushchino is the nearest rural locality.

References 

Rural localities in Alexeyevsky District, Belgorod Oblast
Biryuchensky Uyezd